Shoe Island / Motuhoa is a small island covering some  lying off the east coast of New Zealand's Coromandel Peninsula. It lies immediately to the east of the entrance to Tairua Harbour. The larger Slipper Island lies to the southeast.

The island is steep, with a reef at its northern end.

The island is rated as having outstanding natural character. Of volcanic origin, its basic structure is of rhyolite, with its interior covered by windswept indigenous bush and with bare coastal cliffs. Its general isolation and lack of extensive human activities mean that the island has been left in a largely pristine natural condition.

See also

 Desert island
 List of islands

References

Islands of Waikato
Uninhabited islands of New Zealand
Thames-Coromandel District